Aphelenchus avenae is a mycophagous nematode capable of feeding on plant tissue in culture.

 Feeding: Hyphal feeder; Aphelenchus avenae feeds on a variety of fungi, but is not known to feed on higher plants.
 Hosts: Fungi
 Digestion: A genetic analysis by Karim et al. 2009 reveals cell wall-lytic enzymes in A. avenae - enzymes analogous in function to the β-1,4-endoglucanases in cyst nematodes.
 Life Cycle: Males seem fairly common in some populations, less frequent in others; Capable of withstanding dry conditions through anhydrobiosis. Used as a model system for studying anhydrobiosis.
 Management: Numbers are increased by addition of complex organic materials to soil to enhance fungal decomposition.

References 

Tylenchida